The green-backed sparrow (Arremonops chloronotus) is a species of bird in the family Passerellidae that is found in Belize, northern Guatemala, western Honduras and southern Mexico. Its natural habitats are subtropical or tropical dry forest, subtropical or tropical moist lowland forest, and heavily degraded former forest.

Subspecies and distribution
This bird has two subspecies. Arremonops chloronotus chloronotus inhabits the Caribbean slope and southeastern part of Mexico from Tabasco and northeastern Chiapas to the southern part of Yucatán and Quintana Roo. It can also be found in northern and eastern Guatemala. Arremonops chloronotus twomeyi is found in the Olancho and Yoro departments of north-central Honduras.

References

green-backed sparrow
Birds of Mexico
Birds of the Yucatán Peninsula
Birds of Belize
Birds of Guatemala
green-backed sparrow
green-backed sparrow
Taxonomy articles created by Polbot